Athletics was an African Games event at its inaugural edition in 1965 and has continued to feature prominently at the competition in each of its subsequent editions.

Editions

Events

Men's events

Women's events

Medal table
Last updated after the 2015 edition; Next update after the conclusion of the 2019 African Games
Excluding Para-Athletics.

Medalists

Games records

See also
International athletics championships and games

References

External links
List of previous winners

 
Sports at the African Games
All-Africa Games
African Games